Roger Creton (24 May 1926 – 2 July 2002) was a French racing cyclist. He rode in the 1950 Tour de France.

References

1926 births
2002 deaths
French male cyclists
Place of birth missing